Orveh-ye Olya (also Romanized as ‘Orveh-ye ‘Olyā) is a village in Olya Tayeb Rural District, in the Central District of Landeh County, Kohgiluyeh and Boyer-Ahmad Province, Iran. At the 2006 census, its population was 65, in 9 families.

References 

Populated places in Landeh County